In Greek mythology, Pallas (/ˈpæləs/; Ancient Greek: Πάλλας) was one of the Gigantes (Giants), the offspring of Gaia, born from the blood of the castrated Uranus. According to the mythographer Apollodorus, during the Gigantomachy, the cosmic battle of the Giants with the Olympian gods, he was flayed by Athena, who used his skin as a shield. Though the origin of Athena's epithet "Pallas" is obscure, according to a fragment from an unidentified play of Epicharmus (between c. 540 and c. 450 BC), Athena, after having used his skin for her cloak, took her name from the Giant Pallas.

This story, related by Apollodorus and Epicharmus, is one of a number of stories in which Athena kills and flays an opponent, with its hide becoming her aegis. For example, Euripides tells that during "the battle the giants fought against the gods in Phlegra" that it was "the Gorgon" (possibly considered here to be one of the Giants) that Athena killed and flayed, while the epic poem Meropis, has Athena kill and flay the Giant Asterus, using his  impenetrable skin for her aegis. Another of these flayed adversaries, also named Pallas, was said to be the father of Athena, who had tried to rape her.

The late 4th century AD Latin poet Claudian in his Gigantomachia, has Pallas, as one of several Giants turned to stone by Minerva's Gorgon shield, calling out "What is happening to me? What is this ice that creeps o're all my limbs? What is this numbness that holds me prisoner in these marble fetters?" Then his brother Damastor uses his petrified body as a weapon and hurls him at the gods.

Pallas was also the name of a Titan, with whom the Giant is sometimes confused or identified.

Notes

References
 Apollodorus, Apollodorus, The Library, with an English Translation by Sir James George Frazer, F.B.A., F.R.S. in 2 Volumes. Cambridge, MA, Harvard University Press; London, William Heinemann Ltd. 1921.  Online version at the Perseus Digital Library.
 
 Cicero, De natura deorum, translated by H. Rackham, Cambridge, MA, Harvard University Press, London William Heinemann LTD, 1933.
 Euripides, Ion, translated by Robert Potter in The Complete Greek Drama, edited by Whitney J. Oates and Eugene O'Neill Jr. Volume 1. New York. Random House. 1938.
 Guillén, Lucía Rodríguez-Noriega, "Epicharmus' literary and philosophical background" in Theater Outside Athens: Drama in Greek Sicily and South Italy, edited by Kathryn Bosher, Cambridge University Press, 2012. .
 Hesiod, Theogony, in The Homeric Hymns and Homerica with an English Translation by Hugh G. Evelyn-White, Cambridge, MA.,Harvard University Press; London, William Heinemann Ltd. 1914. Online version at the Perseus Digital Library.
 Hyginus, Gaius Julius, The Myths of Hyginus. Edited and translated by Mary A. Grant, Lawrence: University of Kansas Press, 1960.
 Janko, Richard, The Iliad: A Commentary: Volume 4, Books 13-16, Cambridge University Press, 1992. .
 Robertson, Noel, "Chapter Two: Athena as Weather-Goddess: the Aigis in Myth and Ritual" in Athena in the Classical World, edited by Susan Deacy, Alexandra Villing, Brill Academic Pub, 2001, .
 Wilk, Stephen R., Medusa: Solving the Mystery of the Gorgon,  Oxford University Press, 2000. .
 Yasumura, Noriko, Challenges to the Power of Zeus in Early Greek Poetry, Bloomsbury Academic, 2013. .

Gigantes
Children of Gaia
Deeds of Athena
Metamorphoses into inanimate objects in Greek mythology